The 2022–23 Georgia Southern Eagles women's basketball team represents Georgia Southern University during the 2022–23 NCAA Division I women's basketball season. The basketball team, led by fourth-year head coach Anita Howard, play all home games at the Hanner Fieldhouse along with the Georgia Southern Eagles men's basketball team. They are members of the Sun Belt Conference.

Roster

Schedule and results

|-
!colspan=9 style=| Non-conference Regular Season
|-

|-
!colspan=9 style=| Conference Regular Season
|-

|-
!colspan=9 style=| Sun Belt Tournament
|-

|-
!colspan=9 style=| WBI
|-

See also
 2022–23 Georgia Southern Eagles men's basketball team

References

Georgia Southern Eagles women's basketball seasons
Georgia Southern Eagles
Georgia Southern Eagles women's basketball
Georgia Southern Eagles women's basketball